Natalie Franklin may refer to:

 Natalie Franklin (archaeologist), an archaeologist specializing in rock art 
 List of Home and Away characters (2008)#Natalie Franklin, a character in Home and Away